Ireland competed at the 1968 Summer Olympics in Mexico City, Mexico. 31 competitors, 25 men and 6 women, took part in 32 events in 7 sports.  They did not win any medals.

Athletics

Boxing

Cycling

Three cyclists represented Ireland in 1968.

Individual road race
 Peter Doyle
 Morris Foster
 Liam Horner

Equestrian

Fencing

Four fencers, all men, represented Ireland in 1968.

Men's foil
 Michael Ryan
 John Bouchier-Hayes
 Fionbarr Farrell

Men's team foil
 Fionbarr Farrell, John Bouchier-Hayes, Michael Ryan, Colm O'Brien

Men's épée
 Colm O'Brien
 Michael Ryan

Men's team épée
 John Bouchier-Hayes, Fionbarr Farrell, Michael Ryan, Colm O'Brien

Men's sabre
 Colm O'Brien
 John Bouchier-Hayes
 Fionbarr Farrell

Men's team sabre
 Colm O'Brien, Fionbarr Farrell, Michael Ryan, John Bouchier-Hayes

Shooting

Three shooters, all men, represented Ireland in 1968.

Trap
 Dermot Kelly

Skeet
 Gerry Brady
 Arthur McMahon

Swimming

References

Nations at the 1968 Summer Olympics
1968
1968 in Irish sport